Pyrénées-Atlantiques (Gascon Occitan: Pirenèus Atlantics;  or ) is a department in the southwest corner of France and of the region of Nouvelle-Aquitaine. Named after the Pyrenees mountain range and the Atlantic Ocean, it covers the French Basque Country and the Béarn. Its prefecture is Pau. In 2019, it had a population of 682,621.

History
Originally named Basses-Pyrénées, it is one of the first 83 departments of France created during the French Revolution, on 4 March 1790. It was created out of parts belonging to the former greater province of Guyenne and Gascony, as well as the Béarn-Navarre (still, at least nominally, Kingdom of Navarre), meaning the Basques provinces of Basse-Navarre, Labourd, Bayonne (detached a few years before from Labourd) and Soule, as well as Béarn.

The 1790 administrative design brought about the end of native institutions and laws. All Basque estates representatives from Labourd overtly opposed the new administrative layout since it suppressed their institutions and laws. The representatives of Lower Navarre refused to vote in Paris arguing that they were not part of the Kingdom of France; those of Soule voted against. The brothers Garat, representing Labourd, eventually voted yes, thinking that it would give them a say in upcoming political decisions.

On 10 October 1969, Basses-Pyrénées was renamed Pyrénées-Atlantiques.

Geography
Pyrénées-Atlantiques is part of the Nouvelle-Aquitaine region of Southwestern France. It is bordered by the Landes, Hautes-Pyrénées, Gers departments and the Bay of Biscay. Lac Gentau is located in Pyrénées-Atlantiques, as are the Lacs de Carnau.

Principal towns

The most populous commune is Pau, the prefecture. As of 2019, there are 11 communes with more than 10,000 inhabitants:

Demographics
Population development since 1801:

Economy

Urban areas
Pyrénées-Atlantiques, a border department, has cultivated a number of economic and cultural links with Spain.

Two urban concentrations exist in the east and west of the department: Pau, which has 145,000 inhabitants and 344,000 workers in the local area; and Bayonne-Anglet-Biarritz which has 166,400 inhabitants and 235,000 workers in the local area.

Tourism
The department is known for its tourism industry:

Culture
The parts of the department that were part of Guyenne and Gascony, as well as Béarn, have a culture heavily influenced by the Basques, but clearly different identities.

Both the Gascon Bearnese variant and Basque language are indigenous to the region in their respective districts. Gascon in turn is a dialect of Occitan, formerly the main language of southern France. It is more closely related to Catalan than it is to French. Basque is a language isolate, not related to any known language. Today, French, the sole official language of the French Republic, is the predominant native language and is spoken by virtually all inhabitants.

Pyrénées-Atlantiques is also home to a number of professional sports teams, including rugby union football clubs Aviron Bayonnais, Biarritz Olympique and Section Paloise; basketball club Élan Béarnais Pau-Orthez; and association football club Pau FC.

The Pau Grand Prix, an auto race first held in 1901, has hosted the World Touring Car Championship, British Formula Three, Formula 3 Euro Series and FIA European Formula 3 Championship.

Politics

Pyrénées-Atlantiques is a stronghold of the centrist Democratic Movement (MoDem). Its founder and president, François Bayrou, has served as Mayor of Pau since 2014.

Departmental politics
The Departmental Council of Pyrénées-Atlantiques has 54 seats. Its president has been Jean-Jacques Lasserre of the Democratic Movement since 2015.

National representation
In the 2017 legislative election, Pyrénées-Atlantiques elected the following members of the National Assembly:

In the Senate, the department is represented by three members: Frédérique Espagnac (since 2011), Max Brisson (since 2017) and Denise Saint-Pé (since 2017).

Heraldry
The coat of arms of Pyrénées-Atlantiques combines those of four traditional provinces:

 Lower Navarre
 Béarn
 Labourd
 Soule

Twinning and cooperation
Pyrénées-Atlantiques is twinned with:
  Misiones Province, Argentina (since 2012)

See also
 Arrondissements of the Pyrénées-Atlantiques department
 Cantons of the Pyrénées-Atlantiques department
 Communes of the Pyrénées-Atlantiques department

References

External links

  Departmental Council website
  Prefecture official website
  Archives of the Pyrenees-Atlantiques department website
  Photography Panoramics 360° website
  
  Pyrenees-Atlantiques Monuments, Villages, Walks and Attractions
  Information on living, working and visiting Pyrenees Atlantiques

 
1790 establishments in France
Nouvelle-Aquitaine region articles needing translation from French Wikipedia
Departments of Nouvelle-Aquitaine
States and territories established in 1790